The 1937–38 National Hurling League was the 11th completed season of the NHL, an annual hurling competition for the GAA county teams.

Overview

The National Hurling League featured two groups of teams - Group A and Group B.  Tipperary won all of their games in Group A, beating Galway, Laois and Westmeath in the process. Limerick topped Group B after beating Cork, Waterford, Clare and Kilkenny. The final saw both group winners play off against each other, with Limerick claiming an all-time record breaking fifth National League title in succession.

Division placings

Group A

Group B

Results

Knock-out stage

References

National Hurling League seasons
League
League